Hoshino ( characters for "star" and "field") is a Japanese name. It may refer to:

Companies
Hoshino Resorts
Hoshino Gakki, musical instrument manufacturing company

People
Aki Alien (ほしのあき), Japanese idol
Ayaka Hoshino (星野綾香), AV idol
Chizuko Hoshino (星野千寿子), voice actor
Fumiaki Hoshino (星野文昭), political prisoner
Hidehiko Hoshino (星野英彦) (born 1966), musician
Hidemasa Hoshino (星野英正), golfer
Junji Hoshino (星野順治), baseball player
Kanako Hoshino (星野奏子), singer
Kantarou Hoshino (星野勘太郎), wrestler
Katsura Hoshino (星野桂), manga artist
Kazuyoshi Hoshino (星野一義), racing driver
Kazuki Hoshino (星野一樹), racing driver
Keitarou Hoshino (星野敬太郎), boxer
Lily Hoshino (星野リリィ), manga artist
Mari Hoshino (星野真里), actress and singer
Michio Hoshino (星野道夫), photographer
Mika Hoshino (星野美香), table tennis player
Mitsuaki Hoshino (星野充昭), actor and voice actor
Naoki Hoshino (星野直樹), bureaucrat and politician
, Japanese table tennis player
Nobuyuki Hoshino (星野伸之), baseball player
Osamu Hoshino (星野おさむ), baseball player
Renato Hoshino (星野レナート),logistic and racing driver - Brasil
Senichi Hoshino (星野仙一), baseball player and manager.
Takanori Hoshino (星野貴紀), voice actor
Tatsuko Hoshino (星野立子), haiku poet
Tatsuko Hoshino (星野知子), actress and essayist
Tetsurou Hoshino (星野哲郎), Lyricist
Tomihiro Hoshino (星野富弘), poet and painter
Tomoyuki Hoshino (星野智幸), Novelist
Yachiho Hoshino (星野八千穂), baseball player
, Japanese ice hockey player
, Japanese shogi player
Yukinobu Hoshino (星野之宣), manga artist
Yuzou Hoshino (星野勇三), agronomist

Fictional characters
Ai Hoshino (星野 アイ) a character from Oshi no Ko
Goro Hoshino (星野 吾郎) a character from Choriki Sentai Ohranger
Ichika Hoshino (星乃 一歌) a character from Hatsune Miku: Colorful Stage!
Ruri Hoshino (星野 ルリ) a character from Martian Successor Nadesico
Miyako Hoshino (星野 みやこ) a character from Watashi ni Tenshi ga Maiorita!

Places
Hoshino, Fukuoka, a former village located in Fukuoka Prefecture

Science
3828 Hoshino, main-belt asteroid

See also
Japanese name

Japanese-language surnames